Interface is a game magazine published by Prometheus Press between 1990 and 1992 that was licensed to publish articles about R. Talsorian Games's dystopian near-future role-playing game Cyberpunk.

Publication history
In 1990, three  dedicated fans of Cyberpunk who lived in Alameda, California — Kevin DeAntonio, Chris Hockabout, and Thaddeus Howze — approached R. Talsorian Games about producing an independent  magazine about the game. R. Talsorian agreed to license them, and the three formed Prometheus Press to publish their fanzine Interface. Each issue featured a full-color cover and black & white interior.  

Six issues of the magazine were published between 1990 and 1992.

Index of articles

Volume 1, #1: Keeping the Peace 
(44 pages.)
NuCyber, NuTech, NuMed: New cybernetic implants, new gear, new medicine.
Walking the Beat in Night City
LawTech Unlimited: New law enforcement armor, weapons, and gear. 
Design and augmentation rules for Robohounds (mechatronic K9 units). 
Police Profile: The Givers of Pain
Inmate Penal Corps
Corporate Review: Ocean Technology & Energy Corp (OTEC)
Altered States 1: New Drugs
Cyber-Reviews: Street Lethal  by Steven Barnes; Vacuum Flowers by Michael Swanwick.

Volume 1, #2 (1991) 
(48 pages. Cover art by Chris Hockabout.)
NuCyber, NuTech: New cybernetic hand and leg implants; new gear 
New Skills: Skating / Skateboarding, Electronic Counter-Measures, Cadre Tactics 
"Getting Along": Roleplaying COOL and EMPATHY attributes in Cyberpunk (Peter Christian)
"Your Money or Your Life": Wages in Cyberpunk (Justin Schmid)
Police Profiles: Ripperdocs 
Hardware Closeup: The OTEC SEV-1 stealth hovercraft. 
Subordinate/Alternate Character Classes 1
Cyber-Reviews: Batman: Digital Justice by Pepe Moreno; Hardware, RoboCop 2, Total Recall (1990).

Volume 1, #3 (1991) 
(56 pages. Cover art by Mike Ebert.)
NuCyber, NuWare: New cybernetics; New Cyberdeck programs
Government Profile: New Antarctican Collective 
Corporate Review: Revolution Genetics Inc
New Service Organization: Troubleshooter Cabs.
Artificial Intelligence 1: AIs in Cyberpunk RPGs
Altered States: New drugs
NuScience: Skinmask pollution filter, Vend-a-Mod chip vending machine
Fashion: NewLook faux cybernetics.
"Interview With a Predator": Q&A with Colonel "Butch" Schaffer IPC, commander of the "Predators" Centron
"What's that up ahead?": Random driving encounters in Cyberpunk 2020.
Subordinate/Alternate Character Classes 2: 
Solo subtypes (Military Op, Corporate Op, Cyber-Soldier, Bodyguard, Bounty Hunter, Street Samurai). 
Netrunner subtype (Rogue AI Hunter).
Cyber-Reviews: ME: A Novel of Self-Discovery by Thomas T. Thomas; Akira, Trancers.

Volume 1, #4 (1991) 
(56 pages.) 
"Nomad Chronicles": Nomad characters; types of Nomad Packs. 
Corporate Review: Consolidated Agriculture
Artificial Intelligence 2: "Dragons and Dragonslayers" Rogue AIs and Rogue Hunter NPCs.
"Night City Blues" Fiction by Chris Hockabout
"To Bear Arms" How to Manage Weapons and Armor in Cyberpunk 2020
Subordinate/Alternate Character Classes 3
Cyber-Reviews: Trancers 2, Class of 1999, Moon 44, Bladerunner: The Director's Cut (1991), Highlander II: The Quickening

Volume 2, #1 (1992)
(56 pages, cover art by Tom Shaw) 
OmniEye Interviewer's Camera
Tenaka Sanyo Portable Editing Lab
Exotech Remote Surveillance
Live-Feed Cyberoptic Option
Medusa 2000
Just the Fax, Ma'am
 Electric Nightmares
Reporter Profiles: Clarise DeWinter
Reporter Profiles: Edward "Flash" Leudowski
Reporter Profiles: Zaphial "Argus" Keyes
Facing the Consequences
Talk Hard!
A job with ATTITUDE
Aline3
Mann and Machine
The Lawnmower Man
Night's Edge

Volume 2, #2 (1992)
(68 pages. Cover art by Tom Shaw)
NuCyberware and Ectotechnology
Cults - Hope and Horrors
Call of Cthulhu–Cyberpunk Conversion Rules
Cult Profiles
Scenarios: "Transference" and "A Policy of Pain"
Data Sampling

Reception
In the September 1992 edition of Dragon (#185), Allen Varney reviewed the third issue of the magazine, and while he called one article "meaty", he noted that most of the magazine "falls distinctly below the median [...] Even the good articles could stand more pizazz, and the editorial style needs a lot more polish." Despite this, he concluded "this fan magazine offers remarkable value for the dedicated Cyberpunk referee."

References

Cyberpunk (role-playing game)
Role-playing game magazines